The Leeds International Piano Competition, informally known as The Leeds and formerly the Leeds International Pianoforte Competition, takes place every three years in Leeds, West Yorkshire, England. It was founded in 1961 by Marion, Countess of Harewood, Dame Fanny Waterman, and Roslyn Lyons, with the first competition being held in 1963. Waterman was the chair and artistic director up to the 2015 competition when Paul Lewis and Adam Gatehouse became Co-Artistic Directors. The first round of the competition takes place internationally and in 2021 went 'virtual' when 63 pianists were recorded in 17 international locations and the Jury deliberated online, in order to circumvent the various impacts of Covid. The 2nd round, semi-finals and finals take place in the Great Hall of the University of Leeds and in Leeds Town Hall and in 2018 & 2021 were streamed to a large global audience through medici.tv, achieving over 4.7 million views and listens through multiple channels and platforms, including the BBC, Amadeus.tv (China), Classic FM and Mezzo.tv.

History

The competition was first held in September 1963 when the young British pianist, Michael Roll, became the First Prizewinner. It joined the World Federation of International Music Competitions (WFIMC) in 1965. After the 1996 competition, there was a four-year break before the 2000 competition, to align with the turn of the millennium. Competitors were formerly housed at Tetley Hall, a residence hall at the University of Leeds, which closed in 2006 and are still housed in University residences throughout the competition. The University of Leeds is the Principal Partner of the competition and has supported it since its inception.

The list of eminent past Competition winners includes Radu Lupu and Murray Perahia. The roll call of other Competition finalists is equally illustrious as that of the winners and includes Mitsuko Uchida and Sir Andras Schiff (1975), Peter Donohoe (1981), Louis Lortie (1984), Lars Vogt (1990), Denis Kozhukhin (2006) and Louis Schwizgebel (2012). Sofya Gulyak was the first female first prize winner, awarded in 2009.

Dame Fanny Waterman was the competition's Chair and Artistic Director until her retirement after the 2015 event and she remained Honorary Life President until her death in 2020. She was replaced as artistic director by Paul Lewis (Jury Chair for 2018) and Adam Gatehouse. Gatehouse is now the competition's sole Artistic Director and was joined by Imogen Cooper as Chair of the Jury in 2021.

2018 Competition 
The 2018 competition marked a major refresh to the competition structure:

 The preliminary round of the competition took place internationally for the first time in Berlin, New York and Singapore. 
 The semi-finalists offered two different recitals (one was chosen by the jury) and included the introduction of chamber music in a new collaborative musicianship feature, working with Bjørg Lewis (cello), Jack Liebeck (violin) and the Elias String Quartet. 
 The concerto finale included five finalists in concert with the Hallé orchestra conducted by Edward Gardner. Finalists offered two concertos, one "classically oriented" and one from the Romantic period or later, and one was selected for performance by the jury. 
 Three main prizes were awarded, as well as the Terence Judd Hallé Orchestra Prize and a new medici.tv audience prize, which was voted for online. 
 A festival programme in Leeds was introduced to bring The Leeds out of the concert hall and into the community.
 Medici.tv livestreamed all rounds which remain free to view on the competition microsite.

The prize benefits were redesigned to support the career development of the prizewinners and include mentoring by Paul Lewis and other notable pianists, as well as artist management with Askonas Holt, a recording deal with Warner Classics and a series of international engagements.

A festival programme of masterclasses, talks, educational events and other activities also took place during the competition, including an appearance by Alfred Brendel, free piano lessons in the world's Smallest Concert Hall (a converted shipping container) and the creation of The Leeds Piano Trail across Leeds city centre (pianos for the public to use), supported by The Leeds BID.

Orchestra

The concerto finals have been supported by a number of major UK orchestras over the years including the Royal Liverpool Philharmonic, the City of Birmingham Symphony Orchestra and the Hallé. Sir Mark Elder has conducted the Hallé Orchestra at all the finals since 2003, with the exception of 2018 when the conductor was Edward Gardner. Other conductors with long associations with the Competition have included Sir Charles Groves and Sir Simon Rattle. The BBC has broadcast all Competitions since 1966 on television and radio. In 2018 the Competition was streamed live online for the first time with medici.tv. The Terrence Judd Hallé Orchestra Prize, selected and awarded by the orchestra to one of the six finalists, was introduced in 2012. A new partnership with the Royal Liverpool Philharmonic Orchestra was announced in 2019 for the 20th Edition in 2021.

Hallé Orchestra with Sir Mark Elder (2003–2018)

City of Birmingham Symphony Orchestra with Sir Simon Rattle (1987–2000)

BBC Philharmonic with Sir Vernon Handley (1984)

Royal Liverpool Philharmonic with Sir John Pritchard and Sir Charles Groves (1963–1975) & Andrew Manze (2021)

Prize winners

* Winner of the Terence Judd–Hallé Orchestra Prize.

** Winner of the Yaltah Menuhin Award.

*** Winner of the medici.tv Audience Award.

See also
List of classical music competitions

References

External links

 Official website
 The Leeds 2021 medici.tv channel
The Leeds 2018 medici.tv channel
 Directory of International Piano Competitions
World Federation of International Music Competitions - listing

 
Awards established in 1963
Early career awards
1963 establishments in the United Kingdom
Recurring events established in 1963
Music in Leeds